Sujatha Mohan (31 March 1963) is an Indian playback singer. Best known for her work in Tamil,  Malayalam Telugu and more languages she has, so far, recorded nearly 20000+ songs. She has also recorded songs in other Indian languages including Kannada, Badaga and Hindi and Marathi song films.
Sujatha's career began as a child singer with the film Tourist Bungalow (1975) which had musical score by M. K. Arjunan. In Tamil, she started her career through the film Kavikkuyil (1977) which was composed by Ilaiyaraaja. There after, she recorded many hundreds of songs for composers such as Vidyasagar, A. R. Rahman, Mani Sharma, Koti, Deva, Hamsalekha and others.

Malayalam songs

Tamil songs

Telugu songs

Hindi film songs

Kannada film songs

Television series songs

References

Mohan, Sujatha